Juan Acosta Umazabal (16 April 1907 – 20 September 1994) was a Chilean long-distance runner. He competed in the marathon at the 1936 Summer Olympics.

References

External links
 

1907 births
1994 deaths
Athletes (track and field) at the 1936 Summer Olympics
Chilean male long-distance runners
Chilean male marathon runners
Olympic athletes of Chile
Sportspeople from Santiago